CIM-0216 is a chemical compound which acts as a potent and selective activator of the TRPM3 calcium channel. It produces nociception and inflammation and is used to study the function of the TRPM3 receptor in these processes.

References 

Oxazoles
Acetamides
Phenyl compounds
Tetrahydroquinolines
Transient receptor potential channel agonists